Kiss the Radio is a popular radio program broadcast on KBS Cool FM, airing from 22:10 to 00:00 KST every day.

History 
Kiss the Radio began broadcasting in 2004 with singer-rapper Danny Ahn of first-generation boy band g.o.d as its first DJ. As a radio show which mainly focuses on k-pop, the hosts have been singers from popular idol groups. From 2006 to October 2016, various members of Super Junior hosted the show, which became known as "Sukira", and were the longest-running hosts. Two weeks after Super Junior's last broadcast, on October 17, 2016 the hosting baton is finally passed to band FT Island frontman Lee Hong-gi, therefore making the program being called "Hongkira". Lee Hong-gi stepped down from host position in April 2018 to focus on music and TV broadcast activity. November 2018 Young K of idol band DAY6 hosted from November 2020 through October 12, 2021, during which the program was dubbed "Dekira." As of November 1, 2021, the host has been Minhyuk of BTOB with the program becoming known as "Bikira".

List of DJs

Awards

Controversies

See also 
 Volume Up (Radio Show)
 KBS 2FM

References

External links
 
 http://www.kbs.co.kr/radio/index.html
 http://www.kbs.co.kr/advertise/coolfm.html
 http://www.kbs.co.kr/radio/coolfm/
 http://www.kbs.co.kr/radio/coolfm/kiss/index.html
 https://program.kbs.co.kr/2fm/radio/kissb/index.html 

Korean Broadcasting System
South Korean radio programs
South Korean music radio programs
Korean-language radio programs